John Kourkouas was a senior Byzantine military commander who led a conspiracy against Emperor Basil I the Macedonian.

John Kourkouas (or Κροκόας, Krokoas in Symeon the Logothete, George the Monk, and others) is the first known  member of the Kourkouas family. The family name is Armenian, being a Hellenization of the name "Gurgen", and they hailed from Dokeia (modern Tokat) in the Armeniac Theme. 

The conspirators intended to strike on the Feast of the Annunciation, but the conspiracy was betrayed by Kourkouas' chamberlain. The emperor conducted a public trial of the conspirators in the Hippodrome of Constantinople, condemning them to beatings and forcible tonsure; the hairs left were burned. Then the emperor led the festive procession for the Feast of the Annunciation, forcing the conspirators to march behind him naked. They were then banished and their possessions confiscated.

The sources differ on the exact dating of the affair, with Theophanes Continuatus and John Skylitzes (who follows Continuatus) placing it around 877/78, but modern scholars place it in 886. Skylitzes even gives the leader of the conspiracy the name Romanos instead of John, but the other chronicles are clear in attributing these events to John. Skylitzes' account may be a confusion from the name of John's son (possibly also the name of his father). 

John was the namesake grandfather of the distinguished 10th-century general John Kourkouas.

References

Sources
 
 
 

9th-century Byzantine military personnel
John
Prisoners and detainees of the Byzantine Empire
Byzantine prisoners and detainees
Byzantine usurpers
Conspiracies